Charlotte Taylor (born 17 January 1994) is a British long distance runner. She competed in the women's 10,000 metres at the 2017 World Championships in Athletics. She won an NCAA championship in the women's 10k in 2017.

University of San Francisco

References

External links
 
 
 

1994 births
Living people
British female long-distance runners
World Athletics Championships athletes for Great Britain
Place of birth missing (living people)
San Francisco Dons women's track and field athletes